Jeffrey A. Currey is an American politician from East Hartford, Connecticut. A Democrat, he has been a member of the Connecticut House of Representatives since 2015, representing the state's 11th district in East Hartford, Manchester and South Windsor.

Early life
Currey is a lifetime resident of East Hartford. He is the son of Melody Currey, a former mayor of East Hartford and state representative.

He attended the East Hartford public schools and received his B.A. in theater from Wagner College in New York City.

Political career
Currey was first elected to the East Hartford Board of Education in 2009 and was later elected Chair.

In 2014, when then-Rep. Tim Larson left his state house seat to run for state senate, Currey ran to succeed him. He was unopposed in the Democratic primary and won the general election 66% to 34%. He took office in January 2015 and was reelected unopposed in 2016 and 2018.

Personal life
Currey is openly gay. As of 2018, he is one of two openly LGBT members of the Connecticut General Assembly, alongside Sen. Beth Bye (D–West Hartford).

References

External links
 Legislative homepage

Year of birth missing (living people)
Gay politicians
LGBT state legislators in Connecticut
Living people
School board members in Connecticut
Democratic Party members of the Connecticut House of Representatives
Wagner College alumni
People from East Hartford, Connecticut
21st-century American politicians